The first series of Project Catwalk was hosted by Elizabeth Hurley and featured 12 fashion designers in a competition finding who was the most talented. Kirsty Doyle won the competition, receiving a feature in the British version of Elle Magazine among other prizes.

Series 1 contestants

The 12 fashion designers competing in the first series were:
Kirsty Doyle
Matthew Bowkett
Debi Walker
Christopher Raeburn
Renato Termenini
Marianne Fay]]
Shakeel Rabbaney
Gemma Carver
Lesley de Freitas
Sushino Techakosit
Zoe Hamilton-Peters
Rami Savapley

The 12 models competing for an Elle magazine spread in the first series were:
Jessica Roffey
Ana Korzun
Gemma Chan
Lynsey Clark
Kate Mahoney
Sherene Lawrence
Erika Lucas
Lisa
Caroline Green
Yvonne Morton
Kelly
Charity

Series 1 Challenges

 Green background and WINNER means the challenge won the Project Catwalk.
 Red background and OUT means this model wore the losing design in the episode.
 Blue background and WIN means this model wore the winning design in the episode.
 Light blue background and HIGH means this wore the losing design and was eliminated.
 Orange background and LOW means this model was eliminated.
 Pink background and LOW means the model was the same eliminated.

Series 1 Fashion Models

 Yellow background and WINNER means the model won Project Catwalk.
 Blue background and WIN means this model wore the winning design in this episode.
 Red background and IN means this model wore the losing design in this episode.
 Pink background and OUT means this model was eliminated.
 Hot pink background and OUT means this model wore the losing design and was eliminated.

Series 1 Episodes

Episode 1: Innovation

Designers created a glamorous outfit for a garden party dress made only from materials bought at B&Q Warehouse. The designers had a budget of 50 pounds and 1 hour and 30 minutes to make their purchases. They have two days to complete the design.
Judges: Giles Deacon; Lorraine Candy; and Isabella Blow.
WINNER: Kirsty
OUT: Rami
First broadcast 12 January 2006

Episode 2: Vision

Designers must build a garment that conveys "frisky." They had a budget of 100 pounds and two days to complete the design.
Judges: Julien Macdonald, Lorraine Candy, Sadie Frost, and Jemima French
WINNER: Matthew
OUT: Zoe
First broadcast 19 January 2006

Episode 3: Commercial Appeal

Designers created a city women's outfit to fit with Barbour's current line. They had to pick their fabrics at the studios and have 12 hours to complete the designs.
Judges: Julien Macdonald, Lorraine Candy, and Steve Buck
WINNER: Debi
OUT: Sushino
First broadcast 26 January 2006

Episode 4: Collaboration

The designers created a new look for pop star Kelly Osbourne. A team event with three teams, each with a lead designer and two assistants. Each team had 300 pounds and 15 hours to complete the design.

Christopher, Kirsty and Shakeel
Marianne, Debi and Gemma
Lesley, Renato and Matthew
Note: team leader in bold

Judges: Julien Macdonald, Lorraine Candy, Patrick Cox, and Kelly Osbourne
WINNER: Marianne (teamed with Debi and Gemma)
OUT: Lesley (teamed with Renato and Matthew)
First broadcast 2 February 2006

Episode 5: "Model" Clients

Working with the models that chose them, the designers created a wedding dress for that model. The designers had 20 hours to complete the design.
Judges: Julien Macdonald, Lorraine Candy, and Elizabeth Emanuel
WINNER: Christopher
OUT: Gemma
First broadcast 9 February 2006

Episode 6: Rags to Riches

This episode's challenge is to design a fabulous outfit for a photoshoot using secondhand clothing from TRAID (Textile Recycling for Aid and International Development).  The designers have 10 hours to complete the design.
Judges: Julien Macdonald, Lorraine Candy, and Robert Cary-Williams
WINNER: Renato
OUT: Shakeel
First broadcast 16 February 2006

Episode 7: Savoy Hotel Challenge

Designers created a new Room Attendant uniforms for the Housekeepers of the Savoy Hotel.  Each designer had a budget of 35 pounds and 18 hours to complete the uniform.
Judges: Giles Deacon, AA Gill, and Jutta Asta
WINNER: Matthew
OUT: Marianne
First broadcast 23 February 2006

Episode 8: Design a Collection

The designers were asked to work in a team to design a themed capsule collection for Spring/Summer 2006 for Topshop, a store focusing on Women's fashions in the UK. One designer is randomly selected to be Team Leader. The designers have 15 hours to complete the design.
Judges: Julien Macdonald, Lorraine Candy, Karen Bonser, and Deepi Sekhon
WINNER: none
OUT: Renato
First broadcast 2 March 2006

Episode 9: Design for the Red Carpet

Designers created a dress for the host of Project Catwalk, Elizabeth Hurley, to wear on the red carpet. The designers have 350 pounds and 16 hours to complete the design.
Judges: Julien Macdonald, Lorraine Candy, Georgina Chapman, and Keren Craig
WINNER: Matthew
OUT: Christopher
First broadcast 9 March 2006

Episode 10: Fashion Week (Finale)

The final three designers, Matthew, Kirsty, and Debi, were visited by Elizabeth Hurley at their homes to show their progress of their collection.  The final three are given 4,000 pounds, five months, and the assistance of professional pattern cutters and fashion technicians to create their twelve piece collection for a show at London Fashion Week
Judges: Julien Macdonald, Lorraine Candy, and Ben de Lisi
Winner of Project Runway Series 1: Kirsty
OUT:  (Matthew 1st Runner-Up),  (Debi 2nd Runner-Up)
First broadcast 16 March 2006

Series 1 Guest Judges
Isabella Blow, Fashionista
Giles Deacon, Fashion Designer
Frost French
Steve Buck, managing director of Barbour
Kelly Osbourne
AA Gill, Travel Writer & Food Critic
Robert Cary-Williams
Jutta Asta, Executive Housekeeper of the Savoy Hotel Group
Karen Bonser, Head of Design, Topshop
Deepi Sekhon, Chief Buyer, Topshop
Richard Young, Celebrity Photographer
Georgina Chapman, Fashion Designer
Keren Craig, Fashion Designer

2006 British television seasons
Season 01
2006 in fashion